Breaking Point was an American rock band on the record label Wind-Up Entertainment. It was founded in 1999 in Memphis, Tennessee.

Breaking Point's debut album, Coming of Age, was released in 2001 with a follow-up, Beautiful Disorder, released in 2005.

Their songs have been used in a number of films and theatrical soundtracks, including The Scorpion King, the Funimation dub of Dragon Ball Z: Cooler's Revenge, and Fantastic Four, as well as a trailer for Biker Boyz. Additionally, their song "One of a Kind" had been used as the theme song of Rob Van Dam, who was also featured in the music video, during his WWE career.

Breaking Point toured with the several bands, including Sevendust, Saliva, Theory of a Deadman and Fuel.

In mid-2006, Breaking Point toured the United States with Creed frontman Scott Stapp. As of July 2007, guitarist Justin Rimer has been performing as a member of 12 Stones. Brett recently became the frontman of local Memphis band Aurora. Greg Edmondson is now currently the bassist for Collide Over Me. 

In May 2011, the original incarnation of Breaking Point reunited at Hard Rock Cafe in Memphis, TN for a benefit show and played an acoustic set.    

Original drummer Jody Abbott died in 2022 after a battle with Huntington's Disease.

According to Spotify, as of December 4, 2022, Breaking Point has 149,385 streams per month. Their song "One of a Kind" has 9,703,463 million streams.

Former band members
Jody Abbott (died 2022) - drums
Justin Rimer - lead guitar
Brett Erickson - vocals, lead/rhythm guitar
Greg Edmondson - bass guitar
Aaron "Zeke" Dauner - drums
David Cowell - guitar

Discography

Studio albums
Coming of Age (2001, Wind-up)
Beautiful Disorder (2005, Wind-up)

Singles
"Coming of Age" (2001, Wind-up)
"Brother" (2001, Wind-up)
"One of a Kind" (2002, Wind-up) No. 38 Mainstream Rock Tracks
"Show Me a Sign" (2005, Wind-up) No. 25 Mainstream Rock Tracks
"All Messed Up" (2005, Wind-up) No. 26 Hot Adult Top 40 Tracks
"Promise Keeper" (2005, Wind-up)

Music Videos
Breaking Point Videos at YouTube
One Of A Kind
All Messed Up

Soundtrack contributions
High School Stories
 Wishcraft (2001) (song: "Coming of Age")
Dragon Ball Z: Lord Slug (2001 Funimation dub) (song: "Coming of Age")
The Scorpion King (2002) (song: "27")
WWF Forceable Entry (2002) (song: "One of a Kind")
Dragonball Z: Cooler's Revenge (2002 Funimation dub) (songs: "Falling Down", "Under", "Phoenix")
Fantastic Four (2005) (song: "Goodbye to You")

References

External links

Alternative rock groups from Tennessee
Musical groups established in 1999
Musical groups from Memphis, Tennessee
Wind-up Records artists
1999 establishments in Tennessee